Muz-TV Moldova was the first music television station in Moldova.

Defunct television channels in Moldova
Television channels and stations established in 2007
Television channels and stations disestablished in 2014
2007 establishments in Moldova
2014 disestablishments in Moldova